Frederick G. Slabach is an American lawyer and academic administrator. He is the president of Texas Wesleyan University, a role he has held since 2011.

Early life
Slabach earned his bachelor's degree from Mississippi College, his Juris Doctor degree from the University of Mississippi School of Law, and his Master of Laws degree from Columbia Law School.

Career
Slabach began his career in politics, holding several policy roles. He subsequently was the president of the Harry S. Truman Scholarship Foundation. In 2011, he became president of Texas Wesleyan University.

Personal life
Slabach is married to author Melany Neilson; they have three children.

References

Heads of universities and colleges in the United States
American lawyers
American academic administrators
Mississippi College alumni
University of Mississippi alumni
Columbia Law School alumni
Living people
Year of birth missing (living people)